Hozići may refer to:

 Hozići, Novi Grad, a village in Bosnia and Herzegovina
 Hozići, Glamoč, a village in Bosnia and Herzegovina